Iran participated at the 2010 Summer Youth Olympics in Singapore.

Competitors

Medal summary

Medal table

Medalists

Results by event

3x3 basketball

Boys

Aquatics

Swimming

Boys

Archery

Girls' recurve

Mixed recurve

Athletics

Boys

Boxing

Boys

Canoeing

Slalom

Boys

Sprint

Boys

Football

Girls

Judo

Boys

Mixed

Shooting

Boys

Girls

Taekwondo

Boys

Girls

Volleyball

Boys

Weightlifting

Boys

Wrestling

Boys' freestyle

Boys' Greco-Roman

References

External links
 Official website

2010 in Iranian sport
Nations at the 2010 Summer Youth Olympics
Iran at the Youth Olympics